The Umatilla River is an  tributary of the Columbia River in northern Umatilla County, Oregon, United States. In downstream order, beginning at the headwaters, major tributaries of the Umatilla River are the North Fork Umatilla River and the South Fork Umatilla River, then Meacham, McKay, Birch, and Butter creeks.

The name Umatilla is derived from the Native American autonym of the people residing along its banks - the Umatilla, which called themselves Imatalamłáma - "People from the Village Ímatalam [on the Peninsula formed by the confluence of Umatilla River with the Columbia]", which was first recorded as Youmalolam in the journals of the Lewis and Clark Expedition and spelled in many other ways in early books about Oregon.

Today the river is also called Nixyáawi wána - "Pendleton area River, i.e. Umatilla River".

Course

The Umatilla River's headwaters lie in the Blue Mountains at the confluence of its north and south forks in the Umatilla National Forest of northeastern Oregon. Flowing generally west, the river receives Lick Creek and Bear Creek, both from the right before reaching the unincorporated community of Bingham Springs. Further downstream it receives Rock Creek from the right, then Bobsled, Augur, and Ryan creeks from the left before entering the Umatilla Indian Reservation and reaching the unincorporated community of Gibbon. From Gibbon to the river mouth, tracks of the Union Pacific Railroad run parallel to the stream. Between Gibbon and Cayuse, three creeks—Squaw, Buckaroo, and Coonskin—enter the river from the left. Downstream of Cayuse, Moonshine, Cottonwood, and Mission creeks also enter from the left.

The river flows by Mission at about river mile (RM) 61 or river kilometer (RK) 98, leaves the Indian reservation, and reaches the city of Pendleton at about RM 56 (RK 90), passing under Oregon Route 11. Wildhorse Creek enters from the right, then Patawa Creek from the left. The river passes under Interstate 84 (I-84) and receives McKay Creek from the left.

The Umatilla River joins the Columbia at what is called Lake Umatilla, a reservoir formed by the John Day Dam on the Columbia. McNary Dam, another dam on the Columbia, is slightly upstream at about RM 292 (RK 470).

Fish

The Umatilla River supports populations of spring Chinook, fall Chinook, and Coho salmon as well as small trout in its upper reaches. Public access to salmon and steelhead fishing is fairly good downstream of the Oregon Route 11 bridge. Upstream of the bridge, the river runs through the Umatilla Indian Reservation, where fishing is limited to those with a tribal permit.

See also

 List of rivers of Oregon
 List of longest streams of Oregon

References

Works cited
 McArthur, Lewis A., and McArthur, Lewis L. (2003) [1928]. Oregon Geographic Names, 7th ed. Portland: Oregon Historical Society Press. .
 Shewey, John (2007). Complete Angler's Guide to Oregon. Belgrade, Montana: Wilderness Adventures Press. .

External links

 Umatilla Watershed, "EPA Surf Your Watershed"
 Historic photos from the U.S. Forest Service

Rivers of Oregon
Tributaries of the Columbia River
Rivers of Umatilla County, Oregon